Helmut Gneuss (29 October 1927 – 26 February 2023) was a German scholar of Anglo-Saxon and Latin manuscripts and literature.

Academic career
Gneuss is emeritus professor at the Ludwig Maximilian University of Munich, where he occupied the chair for English language from 1965 to 1997. He served as Visiting Professor of Anglo-Saxon at the University of North Carolina, Chapel Hill, 1974-75. He lives in Eichenau. He is a member of the Bavarian Academy of Sciences and Humanities, the Academia Europaea, the British Academy, the Austrian Academy of Sciences, and the Medieval Academy of America.

Publications
Gneuss's 1976 article on the Anglo-Saxon poem The Battle of Maldon is regarded as "a turning point" in the history of Maldon scholarship. Specifically, his extensive lexicographical study of the important word ofermod "proved beyond doubt" that it means "pride", settling an important question in the interpretation of the poem; in the words of Fred C. Robinson, "the poet's use of ofermod signals a criticism of Byrhtnoth's generalship."

His 1981 publication A preliminary list of manuscripts written or owned in England up to 1100 was described as the next milestone in Anglo-Saxon manuscript studies after Neil Ripley Ker's 1957 book Catalogue of manuscripts containing Anglo-Saxon. The "preliminary" list ("an indispensable tool and essential starting point for anyone interested in Anglo-Saxon literary culture") was followed in 2001 by an expanded and redefined book, Handlist of Anglo-Saxon Manuscripts: A List of Manuscripts and Manuscript Fragments Written or Owned in England up to 1100. The "impact and significance" of his Handlist was the subject of a 2008 Festschrift edited by Thomas N. Hall and Donald Scragg.

Bibliography

References

External links
 
Helmut Gneuss page at LMU Munich

1927 births
2023 deaths
Academic staff of the Ludwig Maximilian University of Munich
Members of Academia Europaea
Fellows of the British Academy
Members of the Austrian Academy of Sciences
German palaeographers
Members of the European Academy of Sciences and Arts
Corresponding Fellows of the Medieval Academy of America